List of Café del Mar compilations are albums released by Café del Mar Music and other labels.

Main Series 
Volumes 1–6 Compiled by Jose Padilla

Volume 1 (Volumen Uno) 

1994

Volume 2 (Volumen Dos) 

1995

Volume 3 (Volumen Tres) 

1996

Volume 4 (Volumen Cuatro) 
1997

Volume 5 (Volumen Cinco) 
1998

Volume 6 (Volumen Seis) 
1999
 Talvin Singh – "Traveller" (Kid Loco's Once upon a Time in the East mix) – 5:51
 Afterlife feat. Rachel Lloyd – "Dub in Ya Mind" (beach club mix) – 5:14
 A New Funky Generation – "The Messenger" – 3:48
 dZihan & Kamien – "Homebase" – 7:15
 Mandalay – "Beautiful" (7" Canny mix) – 4:34
 Humate – "3.2 Bedrock" (ambient mix) – 7:01
 Endorphin – "Satie 1" – 3:08
 Nitin Sawhney – "Homelands" – 5:59
 Rae & Christian – "A Distant Invitation" – 5:14
 Bugge Wesseltoft – "Existence" (Edit) – 7:03
 Paco Fernández & Levitation feat. Cathy Battistessa – "Oh Home" – 4:23
 Marc Collin – "Les Kid Nappeurs Main Theme" – 4:12
 Moonrock – "Ill Street Blues" – 3:46
 Dusty Springfield – "The Look of Love" – 3:41

 NOTE: The Australian release of "Café del Mar Volumen Seis" ((c)1999 Mercury Records Ltd (London)) does not contain the additional track 'José Padilla – "Adios Ayer" – 5:35 ' between tracks 12 and 13 in the track list above, that some other releases (such as the EU release) do.

Volume 7 (Volumen Siete) 
Compiled by Bruno

2000
 Lux – "Northern Lights"
 Afterlife – "Breather 2000" (Arithunda mix)
 Moby – "Whispering Wind"
 Deep & Wide – "Easy Rider"
 Bush – "Letting the Cables Sleep" (The Nightmares on Wax remix)
 UKO – "Sunbeams"
 Aromabar – "Winter Pagent"
 Bedrock – "Beautiful Strange"
 A New Funky Generation feat. Joy Rose – "One More Try"
 Bent – "Swollen"
 Underwolves – "68 Moves"
 Øystein Sevåg & Lakki Patey – "Cahuita"
 Slow Pulse feat. Cathy Battistessa – "Riva"

Volume 8 (Volumen Ocho) 
Compiled by Luke Neville & Ben Cherill

2001
 Goldfrapp – "Utopia" (New Ears mix)
 Thomas Newman – "Any Other Name"
 Afterlife – "Sunrise" (DJ Thunda & The K-20 Allstars remix)
 Dido – "Worthless"
 Mari Boine – "Gula Gula" (Chilluminati mix)
 Lux – "100 Billion Stars"
 Mark de Clive-Lowe – "Day by Day" (DJ Spinna remix edit)
 Ben Onono – "Tatouage Bleu (Avec Chet)"
 Illumination – "Cookie Raver"
 Tiny Tunes – "Will You Catch Me" (Twin Tunes mix edit)
 Skinny – "Morning Light" (A. H. mix)
 Digby Jones – "Piña Colada" (jazz mix)
 Scripture – "Apache"
 Lamb – "Gabriel"

Volume 9 (Volumen Nueve) 
Volumes 9–11 compiled by Bruno

2002
 Jo Manji – "Beyond the Sunset"
 Lovers Lane – "Island Memories" (original mix)
 Blank & Jones – "Desire" (ambient mix)
 Kalliope – "Lunar Landings"
 So Fine – "A Day in the Sun"
 Miro – "The Cure" (sunshine mix)
 Rue du Soleil – "Troya"
 Soft Wave – "Plenitude Part 2"
 CDM – "Many Rivers to Cross"
 Quantic – "Time Is the Enemy"
 Trio Mafua – "Quente"
 Lazybatusu – "8:00 AM"
 Swen G* feat. Inusa – "Morning Light" (coffee shop remix)
 Digitano & CDM – "Rajamanta" [interactive track for Win and Mac]

Volume 10 (Volumen Diez) 

2003
 Substructure – "Firewire"
 Remote – "Postcard"
 Future Loop Foundation feat. Michael Conn – "My Movie Is Like Life"
 Lovers Lane – "Face of Beauty" (original mix)
 DAB – "The Blues"
 Rue du Soleil – "In My Heart"
 Kinema – "Katia"
 Rhian Sheehan – "Garden Children"
 Terra Del Sol – "Sea Goddess"
 Ohm-G & Bruno – "On Your Skin"
 Nacho Sotomayor – "Remember You"
 Vargo – "The Moment" (original mix)
 Ypey – "Without You"
 Blank & Jones feat. Anne Clark – "The Hardest Heart" (ambient mix)

Volume 11 (Volumen Once) 
2004
 Rhian Sheehan – "Te Karanga"
 M-Seven – "Invisible"
 Ludvig & Stelar – "Signal" (ambient mix)
 Jens Gad – "Art Nouveau"
 Ohm-G & Bruno – "In'Side"
 Adani & Wolf feat. Praful – "Where Would I Be" (Memoria Vermelha mix)
 Sonic Adventure Project – "Waters in Motion"
 Miro – "Holding On"
 Rue Du Soleil – "Estonia"
 JP Juice – "Cette Planète"
 Digby Jones – "Under the Sea"
 Tactful – "No Fear"
 Henrik T – "Sueño de la Montaña"
 DAB – "Dream On"

Volume 12 (Volumen Doce) 

2005

Volume 13 (Volumen Trece) 
2006

Volume 14 (Volumen Catorce) 
2007

Volume 15 (Volumen Quince) 
2008

Volume 16 (Volumen Dieciséis) 
2009

Volume 17 (Volumen Diecisiete) 
2011

Volume 18 (Volumen Dieciocho) 
Compiled by Toni Simonen 2012

Volume 19 (Volumen Diecinueve)
Compiled by Toni Simonen 2013

Volume 20 (Volumen Veinte) 
Compiled by Toni Simonen 2014

Volume 21 (Volumen Veintiuno) 
Compiled by Toni Simonen 2015

Volume 22 (Volumen Veintidós) 
Compiled by Víctor Gomez 2016

Volume 23 (Volumen Veintitres) 
Compiled by Toni Simonen 2017

Café del Mar – The Best of
Compiled By José Padilla
2003

Café del Mar – Dreams 
 Volume 2–4 compiled by Bruno Lepretre

Volume 1 
Compiled by Ramón Guiral

 A Man Called Adam – Estelle
 D'Note – D'Votion
 The Sabres of Paradise – Haunted Dancehall
 Miro – Emotions of Paradise –
 Nightmares On Wax – Nights Interlude (original version)
 The Sabres of Paradise – Smokebelch II (Beatless Mix)
 Afterlife – Blue Bar
 Underworld – Second Hand
 A Man Called Adam with Eddie Parker – Easter Song
 Penguin Cafe Orchestra – Music for a Found Harmonium
 Nacho Sotomayor – Café del Mar

Volume 2 

 Sonic Adventure Project – Forty–Two
 Vargo – Get Back to Serenity (Beach Mix)
 Deep & Wide – Castillos de Arena
 Trumpet Man & Cottonbelly – Don't Move
 Ohm G – Chilli Conkani
 Rue Du Soleil – Dreaming Of
 Plastyc Buddha – Voyeur de Luxe
 Racoon feat. Christine Lucas – Beautiful Smile
 David Hertz – Believe
 Jaffa – Do it Again
 Cool Water feat. Time Passing – The Last Night
 Orange & Tusnelda – Stay Asleep
 Ypey – Mellow

Volume 3 

 Zino & Tommy – Ain't Feel Nothing
 Gelka – Please Keep Your Ticket Till the End of Your Trip
 DAB – Have a Smoke
 Luminous – Hold On
 Deise Mikhail – Picasso Suite / Theme from the Summer of '42
 André Andreo – Themes from New Earth
 Buffalo Sánchez – By Your Side
 OHM-G & Bruno – Electric Jungle
 Martin Böttcher – Old Shatterhand Melodie
 Hibiki Connection – Cha Ha Too
 José Luis Zafra – Ritmo del Mar
 Rue du Soleil – Manush
 Gaia Project – Oasis

NOTE: The track listing is in a different order on later releases with an additional track "Bliss: Sleep Will Come" added at the beginning

 Bliss – Sleep Will Come
 OhmG & Bruno – Jungle Light
 Gaia Project – Oasis
 Luminius – Hold On
 Silent Sounds By Deise Mikhail – The Picasso Suite-Theme From Summer Of 42
 Zino & Tommy – Ain't Feel Nothing
 Gelka – Please Keep Your Ticket Till The End
 Martin Boettcher – Old Shatterhand ( orbient mix )
 Rue Du Soleil – Manush
 Buffalo Sanchez – By Your Side
 Hibiki Connection – Cha-Ka-Too (sunset mix)
 Andre Andreo – Themes From New Earth
 DAB – Have A Smoke
 Josè Luis Zafra – Ritmo Del Mar

Volume 4

Café del Mar – Chillhouse Mix 
 Café del Mar Chillhouse Mix – Vols. 1 to 5
Compiled by Bruno Lepretre

Volume 1 (2000)

Volume 2 (2001)

Volume 3 (2002)

Volume 4 (2005)

Volume 5 (2007)

Café del Mar – Aria (2004) 

 Café del Mar Aria – Vols. 1 to 3 and Best of

Volume 1 
 Willow
 Un Bel Di
 Secret Tear
 Dido
 Pace Pace
 Pamina Blue
 Habanera
 Home

Volume 2 
 Arianna
 Ebben
 Addio
 Horizon
 Barcarolle
 Cantilena
 Sviraj (Lullabye)
 Interlude
 Pavane
 Ave Maria
 Leiermann
 Lullabye (Sviraj)

Volume 3 
 Ombra mai fu – Based on the aria from Handel's Serse
 Furioso – Based on Handel's "Sarabande", words from Psalm 7
 Sogno – Based on the aria from Puccini's La rondine
 Metamorphosis 2: Danae
 Ballo – Based on an aria from Verdi's Ballo in maschera
 Interlude: Lorchestre Engloutie
 Amami – Based on the aria from Verdi's La traviata
 Lascia – Based on the aria from Handel's Rinaldo
 Farewell – Based on the aria from Puccini's Madama Butterfly
 Metamorphosis 3: Cyane
 Ascension – Based on the duet from Monteverdi's L'incoronazione di Poppea
 Metamorphosis 1: Arachne
 Furioso: Instrumental Mix
 Ombra: Chilled Mix

Best Of 1999 
 Secret Tear
 Lascia
 Habanera
 Willow
 Horizon
 Furioso
 Ascension
 Pavane
 Arianna
 Pamina Blue
 Ave Marie
 Metamorphosis 2: Danae

Café del Mar – Aniversario

20th Aniversario (2000) 
 CD1
 Nimbus – Subconscious Mind
 Deep & Wide – Seven Seas
 Envers Du Plan – I Want Your Love
 Trüby Trio – Prima Vera
 Fluff – Mums
 Afterlife – Falling
 The Horns of Plenty – Altogether Blue
 Almagamation of Soundz – Enchant Me
 Single Cell Orchestra – Transmit Liberation
 Ypey – Behind the Screen
 Moodorama – Jazz Tip
 La Rocca – Island of God
 Solaris Heights – Elementis

 CD2
 Mental Generation – Café del Mar
 Jean Michel Jarre – Oxygene – Part 4
 Dave A. Stewart feat. Candy Dulfer – Lily Was Here
 Jon and Vangelis – So Long Ago, So Clear
 Foundland – Cloud Pattern
 Brightlight – Feeling Weird
 Tony Stevens – Good Night the Sun
 Andreas Vollenweider – Behind the Gardens – Behind the Wall – Under the Tree
 Café del Mar – Irish Women
 Christian Alvad – Rite
 Garland Dr. feat. Svendasmuss – Offering of Love

25th Aniversario (2005) 
 CD1
 Lovers Lane – Private Session (25th Mix)
 Vargo – Talking One Language (Anniversary Mix)
 Ludvig & Stelar – Reflection
 Lumininius – I Believe in You
 Jo Manji – Innocence
 Henrik T. – Espiral
 Zuell – Albariza
 André Andreo – Sensual Bay
 Digitano feat. Pepe Haro – El Kiosco
 A Man Called Adam vs. Chris Coco – Knots
 Gary B – Lead Me Home
 Rue du Soleil – La Française
 Gelka – Hidding Place
 Digital Analog Band – The Call
 Ypey – Life Time
 Olaf Gutbrod – Moment of Passion

 CD2
 Alessandro Boschi – Ojo de Vega
 Tom Oliver – Free Your Mind
 Azioni Musicali – Volviendo al Sur
 Mic Max – Como el Viento
 Omaya – Novo
 Melibea – Boheme
 Camiel – Take Me to This Place
 Cold Valley – Another Day
 Roberto Sol & Nera – Sensuality
 Lemongrass – Bee
 Glenn Maltman – Chillin'
 DJ3 – Vertigo
 Shiloh – The Gift
 Alejandro de Pinedo – Sex on the Beach
 H. Garden feat. Joi – Gentle Rain

 CD3
 Leslie Round – Calling Back
 Koru – The Meeting
 Steen Thøttrup feat. Anne K – I Hope Yesterday Never Comes
 Zednah – Voluptuous Sunrise
 Marc Puig – To Start Anew
 New Beginning – Nuevo Comienzo
 Chrome vs. Reyne – Newex
 The Light of Aidan feat. Zia Williams – Snowbird
 Prodoxo – Bailanduna
 Elcho – Stop the World (Aquatint Mix)
 Arnica Montana – Memories of the Seas (Café del Mar Mix)
 Joke Society – Morphing Morning
 Deeper & Pacific feat. Geanine Marque – Breeze
 Oleomusic – Lienzo

30 years of Music (2010) 
 CD1

 Clélia Félix – Magical Moments
 Gary B – Without You
 Deep Josh & José Rodriguez Feat. Josephine Sweet – Strangers in the Night
 Luminous – Good to Be Out of the Rain
 Toni Simonen – Parasailing
 Cécile Bredie – Circles
 Javier Esteve – Rainbow Over Black & White
 Paco Fernández – Pez Volador
 Digital Analog Band – Waiting 4 You
 Ive Mendes – What We Have Now
 Bright Sun Spirit – White Sand
 La Caina – A Child Is Born
 Elmara – Central Station Ny
 Motif – Give It Away
 Elimar & Beach Messiah – Better World
 Coastline – Mediterranean

 CD2
 Lunatic Soul – Time to Remember
 Gary B – Esta Noche
 AGP band – Bailando con la luna
 Paco Fernández – Almendros Chill
 Digital Analog Band – I Promise
 Javier Esteve – Hungry Heart
 Sol Eléctrico – Nothing
 Elmara – Slow Train
 Ypey – Somewhere Else
 Nerio Poggi – Season of Love
 Solaris Navis – When the Sun Goes Down
 Wasaby Ink – All My Love
 Atlan Chill – Volar
 Steve Xavier – One World
 Toni Simonen – Endless Sea

35th Anniversary (2015) 

 CD 1
 Cagedbaby – Marmalade
 Kid Loco – A Grand Love Theme
 Quantic – The 5th Exotic
 Caia – Le Telecabine
 Tom Middleton – Astral Projection
 Nightmares On Wax – Les Nuits
 A Man Called Adam – All My Favourite People (Stay With Me)
 Skanna – This Way
 Beanfield – Charles
 Fortunato & Montresor – Imagine (Imagination 2)
 Jakatta – Strung Out
 Jon Hopkins – Candles
 M83 – In The Cold I'm Standing

 CD 2
 The Amalgamation Of Soundz – Textures
 Raze – Break 4 Love (Skunk Dub)
 Kama Sutra – Sugar Steps
 Stonebridge Feat. Therese – Put ‘em High (Claes Rosen Lounge Mix)
 Sydenham & Ferrer – Sandcastles (Afterlife Remix)
 G Club Pres. Banda Sonora – Guitarra G (Afterlife Remix)
 Chymera – Umbrella (Beatless Mix)
 Mike Monday – When The Rain Falls
 Bent – I Love My Man
 Coco & The Lovebomb – Sunset
 Chicane – Already There
 Bliss – When History Was Made
 Penguin Cafe Orchestra – Coriolis

 CD 3
 Amorphous Androgynous – Mountain Goat
 Young American Primitive – Sunrise
 Art Of Noise – Moments In Love (Beaten)
 Autechre – Nine
 Aphex Twin – Untitled 3
 John Beltran – Gutaris Breeze
 Moby – My Beautiful Blue Sky
 Turah – Reishi
 Ian O’Brien – Vagalume
 Detroit Escalator Co. – The Inverted Man Falling
 Wim Mertens – Struggle for pleasure
 Constance Demby – Waltz Of Joy
 Steven Halpern – The Light In Your Eyes
 John Williams – Cavatina

Spin–off Albums 

The series has since expanded with a number of spin-off albums:

 Café del Mar Classic – Vols. 1 to 3
 Café del Mar Essential Feelings
 Café del Mar Vue Mer
 Café del Mar Terrace Mix
 Café del Mar Terrace Mix 2
 Café del 30 Anniversary
 Café del Mar Dubai mixed by Smokingroove
 Café del Mar Aria – Vols 1 to 3

References

Ambient music record labels
Compilation album series branded by bars and cafés